LF System are a Scottish production duo consisting of Conor Larkman and Sean Finnigan. They are from West Lothian and previously worked as a roofer and petrol station worker. 

They topped the UK Singles Chart in July 2022 with "Afraid to Feel", which was also certified platinum by the British Phonographic Industry. This song is based on "I Can't Stop (Turning You On)" from 1970s soul band Silk's album Midnight Dancer, with vocals by Louise Clare Marshall both sped-up and slowed down from the original Philly release.

Prior to this number one, they released the track "Dancing Cliché", which was based on a 1981 soul track written by Luther Vandross called "Party People", which was released by the Harlem funk group the Main Ingredient featuring Cuba Gooding.

Discography

Singles

References

British electronic music duos
British record production teams
Record production duos

Scottish electronic musicians